Balakən is a city and the administrative centre of the Balakan District of Azerbaijan. The city is situated at the foot of the Greater Caucasus Mountains and on the Balakan river, a tributary of the Alazani River.

Etymology 
According to the Concise Oxford Dictionary of World Place Names, the name Balakan may be derived from an Old Georgian word "ბელის კანი (belis k'ani)" meaning "skin of a bear cub".

History 
Throughout its history, the city was ruled by different kingdoms and khanates. In 1918–1920, Balakan was disputed between Azerbaijan Democratic Republic and Democratic Republic of Georgia until both countries were occupied by Soviet Russia and the city became part of Azerbaijan SSR. In 1965, Balakan gained city status after the Azerbaijani government's approval.

Economy 
The economy of Balakan is partially agricultural, partially tourist-based, with some industries in operation.

Society and Culture

Demography 
The majority of the population of Balakan is ethnic Azerbaijanis. There's a significant minority of Avars and smaller minorities of Ingiloys (a subgroup of Georgians).
According to a 2005 survey, 85% of the population was ethnic Azerbaijani, 14% Avar, and the remaining 1% consisted of other ethnicities.

Cuisine 
Balakan's signature cuisine includes maxara, cüttü, chicken chigirtma and Balakan halva.

Gallery

References

External links 
 

Populated places in Balakan District
Avar-speaking countries and territories